Ch'ŏnnae station is a railway station in Ch'ŏnnae-ŭp, Ch'ŏnnae county, Kangwŏn Province, North Korea. It is the terminus of the Ch'ŏnnae Line of the Kangwŏn Line of the Korean State Railway, which connects to the Kangwŏn Line at Ryongdam.

History
The station, originally called Ch'ŏnnaeri station, along with the rest of the Ch'ŏnnae Line, was opened by the Chosen Government Railway on 1 November 1927.

References

Railway stations in North Korea